Erik Jayme (born 8 June 1934, in Montreal) is a German jurist. Until his retirement in 2002 he was professor of Private Law, Private International Law and Comparative Law at the University of Heidelberg. From 1997 to 1999 he served as president of the Institut de Droit International and has served as vice president of The Hague Academy of International Law since 2004.

Academic life 
Jayme was born in 1934 in Montreal. In 1973/1974, he was a full professor at the University of Münster, afterwards at the University of Munich. From 1983 to 2002, he was a full professor of Private Law, Private International Law and Comparative Law at the University of Heidelberg.

Memberships and honours 
Jayme is member of the Institut de Droit International whose president he was from 1997 to 1999. Since 2004 he is vice president of the Curatorium of The Hague Academy of International Law. He is honorary doctor of the universities of Ferrara (1991), Budapest (2000), Montpellier (2003), Porto Alegre (UFRGS) (2003) and Coimbra, Académicien titulaire of the Académie internationale de droit comparé (Paris). He is member of the Heidelberg Academy for Sciences and Humanities (1989), Istituto Veneto di Scienze, Lettere ed Arti (2004) and foreign member of the Royal Netherlands Academy of Arts and Sciences (2005). In 2008 he received the Order of the Southern Cross.

References

External links
Official homepage
 

Living people
Jurists from Heidelberg
Members of the Royal Netherlands Academy of Arts and Sciences
1934 births
German legal scholars
The Hague Academy of International Law people
Academic staff of Heidelberg University